Kakkayam is a dam site located at Koorachundu in Kozhikode, Kerala. Kakkayam is on the outskirts of the Western Ghats, and Malabar Wildlife Sanctuary, a  abode of wild animals including elephants and bisons. Kakkayam has an abundant wildlife population and is also a trekking and rock climbing destination.

The pen stock runs down from the dam site and goes through various tunnels and hills to the Kuttiyadi Main power house at Kakkayam with an installed capacity of 225MW. Water coming out of this power house is diverted to two small hydro electric projects namely Kuttiyadi Tail Race power house and kakkayam small hydro electric project with an installed capacity of 3.75 MW and 3 MW Respectively.After this the tail water joins the river and is utilized for Peruvannamoozhi Irrigation Project.

Gallery

Distance from Kakkayam 
 Kozhikode (58 km)

References

External links

Dams in Kerala
Kozhikode
Year of establishment missing